Alberto Alarcón (born August 31, 1986) is an Argentine footballer currently playing for Alvarado of the Torneo Federal A.

He was born in San Fernando, Buenos Aires.

References
 Profile at BDFA 
 

1986 births
Living people
Argentine expatriate footballers
Argentine footballers
Defensores de Belgrano footballers
Club Atlético Tigre footballers
Club Real Potosí players
Expatriate footballers in Bolivia
People from San Fernando de la Buena Vista
Racing de Olavarría footballers
Association football defenders
Sportspeople from Buenos Aires Province